Josefine Lindgren Knutsson (born 16 January 1996) is a Swedish kickboxer and mixed martial artist. She is the former Battle of Lund Flyweight champion and the 2019 K-1 Flyweight Grand Prix finalist.

Kickboxing career
Knutsson faced the ISKA and future Enfusion strawweight champion Amy Pirnie during Yokkao 27&28. Pirnie won a unanimous decision.

In 2017, Knutsson participated in the IFMA Youth World Championship and won a silver medal. In 2018, she participated in the 2018 IFMA World Muaythai Championships. After winning the four fights in the flyweight tournament, most notably against Janet Todd, Knutsson won a gold medal.

In K-1, Knutsson fought against the K-1 Krush Flyweight champion Kana Morimoto. She lost a unanimous decision. In her next fight, she once again fought Morimoto and won the rematch by a majority decision.

During Krush 104 Knutsson fought Kotomi. Knutsson won the fight by unanimous decision.

Knutsson participated in the 2019 Flyweight Grand Prix. In the semi finals she won a unanimous decision against Mellony Geugjes, but in turn lost a unanimous decision in a trilogy fight with Kana Morimoto.

Combat Press ranked her as a top ten pound for pound female kickboxer between November 2020 and January 2022, peaking at #5.

Mixed martial arts career
Knutsson had one single amateur fight before she made her professional debut. She fought Nina Back at Brave CF 37, winning the fight by unanimous decision.

Knutsson was scheduled to make her mixed martial arts debut against Fabiola Pidroni at Fight Club Rush 8 on March 6, 2021. The bout was later cancelled, as Pidroni was arrested on drug charges. Adriana Fusini took the fight as a short notice replacement. Knutsson ended up winning her professional debut by unanimous decision.

Knutsson was scheduled to face Elizabeth Rodrigues at Fight Club Rush 9 on September 4, 2021. She won the fight by a second-round technical knockout.

Knutsson was scheduled to face Lanchana Green at Fight Club Rush 10 on November 20, 2021. She won the fight by unanimous decision.

Knutsson faced Ye Dam Seo on a Road to UFC: Singapore event on June 10, 2022 with a UFC contract offered to the winner. She won the bout via unanimous decision.

Knutsson faced Jacinta Austin on February 25, 2023 at UAE Warriors 36, winning the close bout via split decision.

Championships and accomplishments

Kickboxing
Professional
Battle of Lund
 2015 BoL Flyweight Champion (One title defense)

K-1
 2019 K-1 Flyweight World Grand Prix Runner-up

Amateur
International Federation of Muaythai Associations
 2017 IFMA World Championships -54kg 
 2018 IFMA World Championships -51kg

Mixed martial arts record
 

|-
|Win
|align=center|5–0
|Jacinta Austin
|Decision (split)
|UAE Warriors 36
|
|align=center|3
|align=center|5:00
|Abu Dhabi, United Arab Emirates
|
|-
|Win
|align=center|4–0
|Seo Ye Dam
|Decision (unanimous)
|Road to UFC: Singapore Episode 3
|
|align=center|3
|align=center|5:00
|Kallang, Singapore
|
|-
|Win
|align=center|3–0
|Lanchana Green
|Decision (unanimous)
|Fight Club Rush 10
|
|align=center|3
|align=center|5:00
|Västerås, Sweden
|
|-
|Win
|align=center|2–0
|Elizabeth Rodrigues
|TKO (knee to the body and punches)
|Fight Club Rush 9
|
|align=center|2
|align=center|0:47
|Västerås, Sweden
|
|-
|Win
|align=center|1–0
|Adriana Fusini
|Decision (unanimous)
|Fight Club Rush 8
|
|align=center|3
|align=center|5:00
|Västerås, Sweden
|
|-
|}

|-
|Win
|align=center| 1–0
|Nina Back
|Decision (Unanimous)
|Brave CF 37
|
|align=center|3
|align=center|5:00
|Stockholm, Sweden
|
|-
|}

Kickboxing record

|-  bgcolor=
|-  bgcolor="#FFBBBB"
| 28 Dec 2019|| Loss||align=left| Kana Morimoto || K-1 World GP 2019 Japan: ～Women's Flyweight Championship Tournament～ || Nagoya, Japan || Ext.R Decision (Split) || 4 || 3:00
|-
! style=background:white colspan=9 |
|-
|-  bgcolor="#CCFFCC"
| 28 Dec 2019|| Win||align=left| Mellony Geugjes || K-1 World GP 2019 Japan: ～Women's Flyweight Championship Tournament～ || Nagoya, Japan || Decision (Unanimous) || 3 || 3:00
|-
! style=background:white colspan=9 |
|-
|-  bgcolor="#CCFFCC"
| 9 Nov 2019|| Win||align=left| Rhona Walker || Fight Night Extreme || Glasgow, Scotland || Decision (Unanimous) || 3 || 3:00 
|-
|-  bgcolor="#CCFFCC"
| 31 Aug 2019|| Win||align=left| Kotomi || Krush 104 || Tokyo, Japan || Decision (Unanimous) || 3 || 3:00 
|-
|-  bgcolor="#CCFFCC"
| 10 Mar 2019|| Win||align=left| Kana Morimoto || K-1 World GP 2019: K’FESTA 2 || Saitama, Japan || Decision (Majority) || 3 || 3:00
|-  bgcolor="#FFBBBB"
| 3 Nov 2018|| Loss||align=left| Kana Morimoto || K1 WGP 2018 || Saitama, Japan || Decision (Unanimous) || 3 || 3:00
|-
|-  bgcolor="#CCFFCC"
| 15 Dec 2017|| Win||align=left| Monika Porażyńska-Bohn || Ladies Fight Night 7: Double Trouble 1 || Łódź, Poland || TKO (Retirement) || 3 || 2:57 
|-
|-  bgcolor="#FFBBBB"
| 15 Oct 2017|| Loss||align=left| Amy Pirnie || Yokkao 27&28 || Saitama, Japan || Decision (Unanimous) || 3 || 3:00
|-
|-  bgcolor="#CCFFCC"
| 12 Nov 2016|| Win||align=left| Anne Line Hogstad || Battle of Lund 8 || Lund, Sweden || Decision (Unanimous) || 5 || 2:00
|-
! style=background:white colspan=9 |
|-
|-  bgcolor="#FFBBBB"
| 22 Oct 2016|| Loss||align=left| Christi Brereton  || Roar Combat League 4 || Watford, England || Decision (Unanimous) || 5 || 3:00
|-
! style=background:white colspan=9 |
|-
|-  bgcolor="#cfc"
| 30 April 2016|| Win||align=left| Claudia Sendlak || Gladiatorspelen 8 || Skövde, Sweden || Decision  || 3 || 3:00

|-  bgcolor="#CCFFCC"
| 14 Nov 2015|| Win||align=left| Therese Gunnarsson || Battle of Lund 7 || Lund, Sweden || Decision (Unanimous) || 5 || 3:00
|-
! style=background:white colspan=9 |
|-
|-
| colspan=9 | Legend:    

|-  style="background:#cfc;"
| 2018-05-19|| Win ||align=left| Buy Yen Ly|| 2018 IFMA World Championships, Final || Cancun, Mexico || Decision (29:28)|| 3 || 2:00
|-
! style=background:white colspan=9 |
|-  style="background:#cfc;"
| 2018-05-18|| Win ||align=left| Juliette Lacroix || 2018 IFMA World Championships, Semi Finals || Cancun, Mexico || Decision (30:27)|| 3 || 2:00
|-  style="background:#cfc;"
| 2018-05-15|| Win ||align=left| Janet Todd || 2018 IFMA World Championships, Quarter Finals || Cancun, Mexico || Decision (30:27)|| 3 || 2:00
|-  style="background:#cfc;"
| 2018-05-13|| Win ||align=left| Ekaterina Gurina || 2018 IFMA World Championships, Round of 16 || Cancun, Mexico || Decision (30:27)|| 3 || 2:00
|-  style="background:#fbb;"
| 2017-05-08|| Loss ||align=left| Valeriya Drozdova  || 2017 IFMA World Championships, Semi Finals || Minsk, Belarus || TKO|| 3 || 
|-
! style=background:white colspan=9 |
|-  style="background:#cfc;"
| 2017-05-07|| Win ||align=left| Xu Yin  || 2017 IFMA World Championships, Quarter Finals || Minsk, Belarus || Decision (30:27)|| 3 || 2:00
|-  style="background:#cfc;"
| 2017-05-05|| Win ||align=left| Madina Gaforova  || 2017 IFMA World Championships, Round of 16 || Minsk, Belarus || TKO || 1 ||  
|-
|-
| colspan=9 | Legend:

See more
List of female kickboxers

References

1996 births
Living people
Swedish female kickboxers
Swedish Muay Thai practitioners
Female Muay Thai practitioners
Swedish female mixed martial artists
Mixed martial artists utilizing Muay Thai
Sportspeople from Stockholm